Blank & Jones are a German electronic music duo, consisting of the members Jan Pieter Blank (born June 15, 1971), known as Piet Blank; René Runge (born June 27, 1968), better known as DJ Jaspa Jones; and the producer Andy Kaufhold (N*D*K) (born December 17, 1969). They have released twelve albums and more than two dozen singles since their first single release "Sunrise" in 1997.

History 
Piet Blank, who became interested in music after purchasing his first record "Kids in America" by Kim Wilde, had his first experience spinning a record on a turntable at age 16. René Runge, who resides in Düsseldorf and who is better known as Jaspa Jones, had his first experience as a DJ at age 19. Together with help from Andy Kaufhold, they formed the trance production team Piet Blank & Jaspa Jones (which would later become simply Blank & Jones) after meeting at the Popkomm music conference.

Even though they had been together for a few years, they did not release their first single, "Sunrise", until 1997. Their first album, In the Mix, was a studio production that came out in 1999. As of 2008, thirteen of their singles have made it into the German Top 50, and three into the Top 20. Each album made the Top 50, including two which reached the Top Ten.

Blank & Jones have teamed up with Robert Smith from The Cure, Anne Clark, Sarah McLachlan, Claudia Brücken from (Propaganda), Pet Shop Boys, and Delerium. They have also contributed to the Café del Mar compilation series and produced their own chill-out albums, Relax, Relax (Edition 2), Relax (Edition 3), Relax (Edition 4), Relax (Edition 5), Relax (Edition 6) and Relax (Edition 7).

They released a single entitled "Miracle Cure" on May 30, 2008, off their new studio album The Logic of Pleasure which is a collaboration with New Order's frontman Bernard Sumner. This collaboration was realised with the help of renowned Berlin based record producer Mark Reeder who is a long term friend of Sumner's. Blank & Jones invited Reeder to remix "Miracle Cure" and this in turn, brought about their collaboration with him and a new project was conceived. This resulted in Reeder completely reworking most of the Blank & Jones vocal tracks for the successful and highly acclaimed 2009 album "Reordered".

In 2012, they produced a new album for the German 80's superstar Sandra called Stay in Touch.

The Singles 
In 2006 Blank & Jones and their long-standing production colleague Andy Kaufhold collated their finest material on one release, The Singles, which also included two new tracks:

The album was also released in Limited Edition format, in which The Singles are complemented by a DVD, bringing together all Blank & Jones videos on one disc for the first time. The videos feature people such as Estella Warren and Til Schweiger in "Beyond Time", the latter having also directed the clip. The DVD was produced and designed by Thomas Jahn, scriptwriter and director of "Knocking on Heaven's Door" and also responsible for "The Hardest Heart", "Mind of the Wonderful", "Perfect Silence" and "Desire". The video for the single "Catch" was directed by Conchita Soares and Toni Froschhammer which features TV actress Nadine Warmuth.

So80s 

From 2009 to 2019 they curated a series of compilation albums featuring 80's music called So80s. The series had 24 volumes. In 2011, they curated So80s Presents Kajagoogoo. In 2012, they curated So80s albums featuring Falco and Sandra. In 2014, they curated So80s presents Alphaville.

Current and past activities 

The chart success of Blank & Jones is partially based on their club-gigs, radio shows and other live-performances including events such as Love Parade, StreetParade and Mayday. The success is further boosted by their activeness as moderators on Eins Live-TV and by being the Co-host on Viva-Clubrotation.

When asked about the key to their success, their response is:

Blank & Jones perform at major festivals and raves in Germany, the Netherlands, Poland and Russia. They also travel further afield on a regular basis, to Canada, Mexico, South America and Australia.

Piet Blank is also the host of the Club Mix that is aired on international flights by Lufthansa, where he hosts a two-hour radio show that shows different artists such as Totally Enormous Extinct Dinosaurs and Fritz Kalkbrenner. The show is hosted in German as well as in English.

Discography

Albums

As Blank & Jones 
 1999: In da Mix
 2000: DJ Culture (Limited edition with 2 CDs. Disc 2 includes bonus tracks and The Nightfly video)
 2001: Nightclubbing (Limited edition with 2 CDs including ambient tracks)
 2002: Substance (Limited with 2 CDs and bonus tracks)
 2003: Relax (Limited edition in a different package)
 2004: Monument (Limited edition with 2 CDs including bonus tracks)
 2005: Relax Edition 2 (2 CDs) (Limited edition includes bonus tracks)
 2006: The Singles (Limited edition includes DVD with singles clips and some bonus)
 2007: Relax Edition 3 (2 CDs)
 2008: The Logic of Pleasure
 2009: Relax Edition 4 (2 CDs)
 2009: Eat Raw for Breakfast
 2009: Reordered (Blank & Jones, Mark Reeder)
 2010: Relax Edition 5 (2 CDs)
 2010: Chilltronica No 2
 2011: Relax Edition Six
 2012: Relax Edition Seven
 2012: Relax-Jazzed (Blank & Jones album in cooperation with Julian and Roman Wasserfuhr)
 2013: Relax - A Decade 2003-2013 - Remixed & Mixed
 2013: Relax - The Best of A Decade 2003-2013
 2014: Relax Edition Eight
 2015: Relax Edition Nine
 2016: Milchbar Seaside Season 8
 2016: DOM
 2017: #WhatWeDoAtNight
 2017: Relax Edition 10
 2017: Chilltronica No.6 
 2018: Milchbar Seaside Season 10
 2018: Relax Edition 11
 2020: Milchbar Seaside Season 12
 2021: Milchbar Seaside Season 13

Production for other artists 

 2012: Sandra - Stay in Touch

Singles 
 Sunrise (1997)
 Heartbeat (1998)
 Flying to The Moon (1998)
 Cream (1999) (UK #24 and #1 in Dance Charts)
 After Love (1999) (UK #57)
 The Nightfly (2000) (UK #55)
 DJ Culture (2000)
 Sound of Machines (Released in Italy and Netherlands as Single) (2000)
 Beyond Time (2000) (UK #53)
 DJs, Fans & Freaks (D.F.F.) (2001) (UK #45)
 Nightclubbing (2001)
 Desire (2002) (Germany #10)
 Watching the Waves (2002)
 Suburban Hell (2002) (Released only in Vinyls)
 The Hardest Heart (feat. Anne Clark) (2002) (Germany #2 In EuroHits Charts / UK # 3 In British Euroscene Singles / Costa Rica # 5 Top 20 Hits Radio / Guatemala #2 Los 10 Más Buscados Radio Infinita )
 A Forest (Feat. Robert Smith) (2003) (Australia #97 )
 Summer Sun (2003) (Released only in Vinyls)
 Mind of the Wonderful (feat. Elles de Graaf) (2004)
 Perfect Silence (feat. Bobo) (2004)
 Revealed (with Steve Kilbey) (2005) (#3 Guatemalan Charts)
 Catch (Vocals by Elles de Graaf) (2006)
 Sound of Machines 2006 (2006)
 Miracle Cure (2008) (#90 Germany)
 California Sunset (2008)
 Where You Belong (feat. Bobo) (2008)
 Relax (Your Mind) (feat. Jason Caesar) (2009)
 Lazy Life (feat. Jason Caesar) (2009)
 Miracle Man (with Cathy Battistessa) (2010)
 Pura Vida (with Jason Caesar) (2011)
 April (2016)

Remixes 
1998
 Basic Connection – Angel (Don't Cry) (Blank & Jones Remix)
 Sash! – La Primavera (Blank & Jones Mix)
 Syntone – Heal My World (Blank & Jones Mix)
 Dario G – Sunmachine (Blank & Jones Mix)
 Humate – Love Stimulation (Blank & Jones Mix)
 United Deejays – Too Much Rain (Blank & Jones vs. Gorgeous Mix)
 Dune – Electric heaven (Blank & Jones Club Cut)
 Yello vs Hardfloor – Vicious Games (Blank & Jones Mix)

1999
 Liquid Love – Sweet Harmony (Blank & Jones Mix)
 Mauro Picotto – Iguana (Blank & Jones Remix)
 Storm – Love is here to stay (Blank & Jones Mix)

2001
 Perpetuous Dreamer – The Sound of Goodbye (Blank & Jones Mix)
 Fragma – You are Alive (Blank & Jones Remix)
 Die Ärzte – Rock'n Roll Übermensch (Blank & Jones Mix)

2002
 Pet Shop Boys – Home & Dry (Blank & Jones Dub)
 Pet Shop Boys – Home & Dry (Blank & Jones Mix)

2003
 Pet Shop Boys – Love Comes Quickly (Blank & Jones 2003 mix)
 RMB – Beauty of Simplicity (Blank & Jones Retouch)
 RMB – ReReality (Blank & Jones Remix)
 Wolfsheim – Wundervoll (Blank & Jones Remix)
 Evolution feat. Jayn Hanna – Walking on Fire (Blank & Jones Remix)
 Chicane – Love on the Run (Blank & Jones Dub Remix)
 Chicane – Love on the Run (Blank & Jones Remix)

2004
 Blank & Jones – The Blue Sky (2004 Update)

2006
 Blank & Jones – The Nightfly (WMC 06 Retouch)

2007
 Delerium – Lost & Found (Blank & Jones Radio Mix)
 Delerium – Lost & Found (Blank & Jones Late Night Mix)
 Delerium – Lost & Found (Blank & Jones Electrofied Mix)

2009
 Johnny Hates Jazz – I Don't Want To Be A Hero (Blank & Jones Remix)

2010
 Daniela Katzenberger - "Nothing's Gonna Stop Me Now" (Blank & Jones Club Remix)
 Daniela Katzenberger - "Nothing's Gonna Stop Me Now" (Blank & Jones Radio Edit)
 Daniela Katzenberger - "Nothing's Gonna Stop Me Now" (Blank & Jones Dub)

2011
 Medina - Gutter (Blank & Jones Club Remix)
 Medina - Gutter (Blank & Jones Radio Edit)
 Medina - Gutter (Blank & Jones Dub)

Compilations and DJ Mixes 

 Trance Mix USA vol. 2 (2001) (Released in US)
 The Mix volume 1 (2 CDs) (2002)
 The Mix volume 2 (2 CDs) (2003)
 The Mix volume 3 (2 CDs) (2004)
 Peaktime 5 (2 CDs**) (2005) (Released in Australia) **CD 2 Is the album DJ Culture
 Posh Trance (2008)
 Milchbar Seaside Season, Vol. 02 (2010)
 RMX - Superstars remixed by Superstars (2011)

So80s series complications 

 So80s (Volume 1-13)(2009-2019)
 So80s Presents Kajagoogoo (2011)
 So80s Presents Ultravox (2011)
 So80s Presents OMD (2011)
 So80s Presents Heaven 17 (2011)
 So80s Presents Billy Idol (2012)
 So80s Presents Culture Club (2012)
 So80s Presents Falco (2012)
 So80s Presents Sandra (2012)
 So80s presents Formel Eins (2013)
 So80s Presents ZTT (A Remixed Obstacle In The Path Of The Obvious) (2014)
 So80s presents Alphaville (2014)

References

External links 
 Official Radio Show http://www.ah.fm
 
 

German electronic music groups
German trance music groups
German musical duos
Electronic music duos
Trip hop groups
Club DJs
German house music groups
German house musicians
German DJs
Remixers
Musical groups established in 1995
Downtempo musicians
Electronic dance music DJs
Varèse Sarabande Records artists